The Beata Pawlak Memorial Award (Polish: Nagroda im. Beaty Pawlak) is an annual Polish literary prize founded in 2003 and awarded to authors publishing their works in the Polish language whose subject-matter concerns the themes of religion, culture and civilisation. The award was created to honour the last wish of a Polish award-winning writer and journalist Beata Pawlak who died in the 2002 Bali bombings in Indonesia.

The winner of the award is selected by a jury which has included such members as Adam Szostkiewicz, Wojciech Tochman, Olga Stanisławska, and Wojciech Jagielski.

Laureates 
 2020 - Agnieszka Pajączkowska for Wędrowny Zakład Fotograficzny ("Wandering Photographic Institute")
 2019 - Mirosław Wlekły for Raban! O kościele nie z tej ziemi ('Raban! About a Church out of This World")
 2018 - Ewa Wanat for Deutsche nasz. Reportaże berlińskie ("Our Deutsche. Berlin Reports")
 2017 - Krzysztof Kopczyński and Anna Sajewicz for Dybuk. Opowieść o nieważności  świata ("The Dybbuk: A Tale of the Insignificance of the World")
 2016 - Jarosław Mikołajewski for Wielki przypływ and Dariusz Rosiak for Ziarno i krew. Podróż śladami bliskowschodnich chrześcijan
 2015 - Konrad Piskała for Dryland
 2014 - Mateusz Janiszewski for Dom nad rzeką Loes ("House on the Loes River") and Adam Lach for Stigma
 2013 - Wojciech Górecki for Abchazja ("Abkhazia")
 2012 - Bartosz Jastrzębski and Jędrzej Morawiecki for Krasnojarsk Zero 
 2011 - Witold Szabłowski for Zabójca z miasta moreli. Reportaże z Turcji ("The Assassin From the Apricot City. Reportages From Turkey")
 2010 - Marek Kęskrawiec for Czwarty pożar Teheranu ("The Fourth Fire of Tehran")
 2009 - Jacek Milewski for Dym się rozwiewa and Max Cegielski for Oko świata. Od Konstantynopola do Stambułu ("The Eye of the World. From Constantinople to Istanbul")
 2008 - Artur Domosławski for Zbuntowana Ameryka ("Rebellious America") and Cezary Michalski for Listy z Ameryki ("Letters from America")
 2007 - Mariusz Szczygieł for Gottland
 2006 - Beata Pawlikowska for Blondynka na Kubie. Na tropach prawdy i Ernesta Che Guevary and Paweł Smoleński for Izrael już nie frunie
 2005 - Joanna Bator for Japoński wachlarz ("The Japanese Fan")
 2004 - Piotr Kłodkowski for Doskonały smak orientu ("Exquisite Taste of the Orient") and Andrzej Stasiuk for Jadąc do Babadag ("Travelling to Babadag")
 2003 - Anna Fostakowska for Spuść oczy, płacz

References 

Polish literary awards